Bachupally is a suburb in the Medchal-Malkajgiri district of the Indian state of Telangana. It is the mandal headquarters of Bachupally mandal in Malkajgiri revenue division. It was a part of Ranga Reddy district before the re-organisation of districts in the state.

Economy 
Real estate in Bachupally is one of the major sector in the area contributing to the economy. It also referred to as the Pharmaceutical hub of Hyderabad, as it houses R&D centers of top global pharma manufacturers including Dr.Reddy's lab, Aurobindo Pharma, and SMS Pharma.

Education 

Junior Colleges: Sri Chaitanya, Gayatri Jr College, Abhyas junior college, bhashyam Jr College, and Narayana residential colleges are located in Bachupally.

Engineering Colleges: Gokaraju Rangaraju Institute of Engineering and Technology, VNR Vignana Jyothi Institute of Engineering and Technology, and BVRIT .

University: Potti Sreeramulu Telugu University (100-acre campus, under construction)

Schools: Keshava Reddy, Kennedy, Sentia, Surya, Ganges Vally, The Oakridge International School, Delhi Public School, Silver Oaks, Laurus - the school of excellence, VIKAS and Geetanjali IIT Olympiad school are few of the top schools located here.

Healthcare 

SLG Hospital, Mamata Academy of Medical Sciences Hospital, Swastik Hospital

Road 

Bachupally is well connected by road to all major areas, as TSRTC runs daily services to the IT corridor and to the other places of the city. The service to Hitech city runs every 30 mins. Travel time between Bachupally and Hitech City (The IT Hub) is around 20-30mins, depending upon the traffic situation.

Bachupally may be reached by road via ORR, driving through Mallampet which is a motorable road, and then the drive on the 6-lane ORR. The area dwellers highlight that the drive on ORR is pleasing and free of problems, even after onset of monsoon.

Metro 

The closest metro stations are Miyapur and JNTU metro station

JNTU metro station is located at Nizampet cross roads

Rail 

The closest MMTS train station is at Hafeezpet.

Transport 

Bachupally is well connected by road to all major areas, as TSRTC runs daily services to the IT corridor and to the other places of the city. The closest MMTS train station is at Hafeezpet. The closest metro stations are Miyapur and JNTU College.

Lakes 

Bachupally Bin Kunta Lake(Biruni), Meddi Kunta are the big lakes and there are few other as well, totally 17 lakes in Bachupally.

Real estate 

Real estate has grown in recent years. Skyscrapers are coming up in gated community such as UrbanRise OnCloud33 and Vasavi Urban, on Bachupally Main Road.

Some of the developments are Sreehomes Colony, SRR, and Praneeth.  Sukruti Homes (Sri Avani) is also very close to Bachupally.

Both are located just one and half kilometres from Bachupally cross roads.

Sree Homes Colony, Opp RelianceSmart, Silver Oak School Road, Bachupally 
Sree Homes Colony is the biggest and most popular gated community, having more than 145 plots containing individual houses, duplex villas and apartments. It is located a half kilometre away from Bachupally cross roads. This community have access to near by schools, super markets, restuaraents etc.

SRR Pride Bachupally 
SRR Pride, constructed in 2011, is a gated community with 56 houses located exactly one and half kilometres from Bachupally cross roads.

SRR Pride community has a swimming pool and children's play area.

It also has a function/community hall within the community.  Major festivals such as Ganesh Chaturthi, Godadevi Kalyanam, and Sitarama Kalyanam are celebrated in the function hall.

Srinivasa Towers 
The Srinivasa Towers apartments are located exactly one kilometre from Bachupally Cross roads.  It was constructed in 2010.

SVS Abharana Enclave 
SVS Abharana is a gated community with 130 villas. it is 0.5 kilometres from Bachupally Cross roads.
SRINIVASA LAKE VIEW VILLAS is a gated community with 123 villas.it is 0.5 km from bachu pally signal

Praneeth Zenith Apartments 
Praneeth Zenith Apartments is an gated community residential apartments, it is built by Praneeth Developers. it is 0.2 kilometres from Bachupally Cross roads.

Shreya Residency 
This apartment building is 0.2 kilometres from Bachupally Cross roads.

Pleasant Ville Bachupally 
Pleasant Ville is a gated community with 68 villas. It is 1.2 kilometres from Bachupally Cross roads, behind Silver Oaks International School.

Srinidhi's Oaklands Villas 
Bachupally, Hyderabad's Renuka Yellamma Colony is next to the temple - Renuka Yellamma temple .
A villa with the ideal fusion of modern technology and architecture to offer a comfortable living environment.
A total of 5 acres of land make up the gated community. Each villa  has two floors. 85 housing units are there. The Villas are in: 3BHK
From 153.29 square metres to 204.38 square metres is the size of the villa.
Car parking is also available. There is a park , club house , outdoor gym and cricket ground available. There is garden area for each villa.

References 
4. Nizampet Municipal Corporation Official website of Nizampet Municipal Corporation.

Villages in Medchal–Malkajgiri district